Cayetano Germosén is a town in the Espaillat province of the Dominican Republic. It is also known as Guanabano. It is known for itsfertile soil.

References

External links
World Gazeteer: Dominican Republic – World-Gazetteer.com

Municipalities of the Dominican Republic
Populated places in Espaillat Province